Mecyclothorax karschi is a species of ground beetle in the subfamily Psydrinae. It was described by Blackburn in 1882.

References

karschi
Beetles described in 1882